Biasca may refer to:

Biasca, town in the district of Riviera in the canton of Ticino in Switzerland
Biasca–Acquarossa railway, a Swiss metre gauge railway that linked the towns of Biasca and Acquarossa, in the canton of Ticino
Biasca railway station, in Biasca, Swiss canton of Ticino
Cima di Biasca, mountain of the Swiss Lepontine Alps, located southeast of Biasca